Aldo Jair Cavero Carozzi (born 24 October 1971) is a Peruvian former footballer who played as a forward. He made two appearances for the Peru national team in 1997. He was also part of Peru's squad for the 1997 Copa América tournament.

References

External links
 

1971 births
Living people
Footballers from Lima
Peruvian footballers
Association football forwards
Peru international footballers
Cienciano footballers
Club Alianza Lima footballers
FBC Melgar footballers